Bikh (also Romanized as Bīkh) is a village in Fatuyeh Rural District, in the Central District of Bastak County, Hormozgan Province, Iran. At the 2006 census, its population was 21, in 5 families.

References 

Populated places in Bastak County